is a railway station on the Aizu Railway Aizu Line in the town of Shimogō, Minamiaizu District, Fukushima Prefecture, Japan, operated by the Aizu Railway..

Lines

Station layout
Aizu-Shimogō Station has a single island platform connected to the station building by a level crossing.  The station is staffed.

Platforms

Adjacent stations

History
It was renamed to its present name on July 16, 1987.

Surrounding area
 Narahara Post Office
 Shimogō Town Hall

See also
 List of railway stations in Japan

External links

 Aizu Railway Station information 

Railway stations in Fukushima Prefecture
Aizu Line
Railway stations in Japan opened in 1934
Shimogō, Fukushima